Events from the year 1640 in France

Incumbents
 Monarch – Louis XIII

Events

Introduction of the Louis d'or
The Battle of Cádiz

Births

Full date missing
Étienne Chauvin, Protestant divine (died 1725)
Marguerite de la Sablière, salonist and polymath (died 1693)

Deaths
30 May – André Duchesne, historian and geographer (born 1584)

Full date missing
Claude de Bullion, aristocrat and politician (born 1569)
John Francis Regis, priest (born 1597)
Isaac Manasses de Pas, Marquis de Feuquieres, soldier (born 1590)

See also

References

Links

1640s in France